Garena is a Singaporean game developer and publisher of free online games. It is the digital entertainment arm of parent company Sea Ltd, which was formerly named Garena.

The company distributes game titles on Garena+ in various countries across Southeast Asia and Taiwan, including the multiplayer online battle arena (MOBA) games League of Legends and Heroes of Newerth, the online football (soccer) game FIFA Online 3, the first-person shooter game Point Blank, the mobile MOBA game Arena of Valor and the mobile racing game Speed Drifters.

In 2017, it released Garena Free Fire, which had over 150 million daily active users globally as of May 2021.

History

Game developments 
In November 2011, Garena announced its publishing rights for the team-based shooter game, Firefall, in Southeast Asia and Taiwan.

In December 2011, Garena announced their collaboration with online games developer, Changyou, to publish and operate the popular 3D martial arts game, Duke of Mount Deer, in Taiwan. The game was the first MMORPG game available through Garena+. The game combines a classic Chinese story with the latest 3D rendering technology and cinematic quality graphics. Duke of Mount Deer was created by several top online-gaming experts from China and South Korea and has gained much popularity in China. The same month, the "Dominion" game mode for Garena's League of Legends players in Singapore and Malaysia.

In 2012, it launched its first product, Garena+, an online game and social platform for people to discover, download and play online games.

In 2014, the World Startup Report valued Garena as a 1 billion internet company and ranked it as the largest internet company in Singapore.

Recent updates 
In March 2015, the Ontario Teachers' Pension Plan (OTPP), one of the largest pension funds in the world, invested in Garena, valuing the company at over US$2.5 billion.

In May 2017, Garena was renamed to Sea Limited. However, Garena was retained as a brand name of Sea Limited (aka Sea Group).

In October 2017, Sea Limited filed for an initial public offering on the New York Stock Exchange (NYSE) and aimed to raise US$1 billion. Before the IPO, Tencent was the major shareholder of Sea Limited, for around 20% of outstanding shares and is currently at 18.7%. It was followed by Blue Dolphins Venture, established by Forrest Li, for 15%. Li personally owned 20% shares, and Chief Technology Officer, Gang Ye, 10%.

In January 2021, Garena acquired Vancouver-based Phoenix Labs, the developers of Dauntless. The acquisition did not affect the operations of Phoenix Labs or Dauntless, but helped Garena expand its international presence.

As of the second quarter of 2021, Garena recorded 725 million active users, 45% more than the year prior, while the number of paid users grew 85% year-on-year, reaching 92 million. The outlook for Garena is expected to decline in 2022, after reports in March 2022 suggested that Garena will post US$2.9 to US$3.1 billion in bookings for the year, down from US$4.6 billion in 2021. The muted forecast would be Garena's first decline in business ever. The ban imposed on its Free Fire title in India across both Google Play and Apple app stores has been cited as a contributory factor.

Products
Garena+ is an online game and social platform that has an interface similar to instant messaging platforms. Garena+ allows gamers to develop buddy lists, chat with friends online and check on game progress and achievements. Gamers can create their own unique identity by customizing their avatar or changing their names. Gamers are also able to form groups or clans, and chat with multiple gamers simultaneously through public or private channels through Garena+. Garena+ users use a virtual currency, Shells.

Other products include BeeTalk and TalkTalk.

Events and tournaments
In May 2012, Garena launched the Garena Premier League (GPL), a six-month-long online professional gaming league with more than 100 matches to be played. The first season of GPL is a League of Legends competition which comprises six professional teams. The teams are Bangkok Titans (Thailand), Kuala Lumpur Hunters (Malaysia), Manila Eagles (Philippines), Saigon Jokers (Vietnam), Taipei Assassins (Taiwan) and Singapore Sentinels (Singapore), which represent top players from respective countries. GPL matches are captured and broadcast online along with commentaries, which are available for viewers to watch on the GPL official website.

In January 2013, Garena announced the second season of the Garena Premier League, which would start on 4 January 2013. Garena Premier League 2013 includes two new teams from Taiwan and Vietnam, bringing the total number of teams to eight. The teams are: AHQ, Saigon Fantastic Five, Bangkok Titans, Kuala Lumpur Hunters, Manila Eagles, Saigon Jokers, Taipei Assassins and Singapore Sentinels.

In November 2014, the Garena e-Sports Stadium, a dedicated venue for esports, opened in Neihu District, Taipei. The studio was built partially to accommodate the beginning of the League of Legends Masters Series, the top-level Taiwan, Hong Kong, and Macau LoL league that was spin-off of the GPL.

In January 2015, Garena launched Iron Solari League, a women's League of Legends tournament in the Philippines. It is a monthly event organized in the second half of each month. It aims to encourage participation by under-represented groups and is open to all those who self-identify as female.

Besides competitive tournaments, Garena also organizes events to cater to users to meet and connect offline. This includes the annual Garena Carnival held in Singapore and Malaysia.

Controversies
On 3 February 2015, Garena eSports announced limitations on the number of gay and transgender people participating in a women-only League of Legends tournament, due to concerns that LGBT participants might have an "unfair advantage". This led to gamers questioning the decision, while League of Legends developer Riot Games responded that "LGBT players are welcome at official LoL tourneys". On 4 February 2015, Garena apologized and subsequently removed the restrictions.

Published games
Garena provides a platform for game titles such as Defense of the Ancients and Age of Empires, and also publishes games, like multiplayer online battle arena games League of Legends, Heroes of Newerth, Free Fire, Call of Duty and Black Shot for players in the region.

Garena-published games:

See also
List of game companies in Singapore

References

External links
 
 Official website (Indonesian)
 Official website (Taiwan)

2009 establishments in Singapore
Android (operating system) games
Companies of Singapore
iOS games
Mass media companies established in 2009
Multiplayer video game services
Singaporean brands
Singaporean social networking websites
Video game companies established in 2009